James Howard (? - November 8, 1879) was an American soldier and Medal of Honor recipient.

Biography 
Howard was born in Newton, New Jersey. He served in the Union Army as a Sergeant in Company K of the 158th New York Volunteer Infantry Regiment during the American Civil War. Howard eanred his medal in action at Battery Gregg during the Third Battle of Petersburg, Virginia on April 2, 1865. He received his medal on May 12, 1865. He died on November 8, 1879, in Fort McKavett, Texas and is now buried in San Antonio National Cemetery, Texas.

Medal of Honor Citation 
Carried the colors in advance of the line of battle, the flagstaff being shot off while he was planting it on the parapet of the fort.

References 

1879 deaths
People from Newton, New Jersey
American Civil War recipients of the Medal of Honor
United States Army Medal of Honor recipients
Year of birth missing